St. Michael's Catholic Cemetery is a private cemetery located in Happy Valley, on Hong Kong Island, Hong Kong. It is managed by The Catholic Diocese of Hong Kong together with Holy Cross Catholic Cemetery, Cape Collinson and St. Raphael's Catholic Cemetery, Cheung Sha Wan. It is also the oldest Catholic cemetery in Hong Kong.

Notable burials

Diocese bishops
Cardinal John Baptist Wu (1925 - 2002), 5th Bishop and first Cardinal of Hong Kong
Bishop Michael Yeung (1945 - 2019), 8th Bishop of Hong Kong

Clergy
Fr. Alfred Deignan SJ (1927 - 2018), former Principal of Wah Yan College

Others
Harold Lee (1910 - 1980), co-founder of Television Broadcasts Limited
William Mong GBS (1927 - 2010), founder and chairman of the Shun Hing Group
Raymond Wu GBS (1936 - 2006), member of Hong Kong delegate to the National People's Congress
Sir Harry Fang GBM, OBE, JP (1923 - 2009), co-founder of Hong Kong Society for Rehabilitation
Peter Tsao CBE, (1933 - 2005), former Secretary for Administrative Services and Information and Secretary for Home Affairs
Tang King Po (1879 - 1956), OSSP, famous entrepreneur
Linda Lin Dai (1934-1964),
Film actress

See also
List of cemeteries in Hong Kong
Holy Cross Catholic Cemetery

References

External links
Saint Michael's Catholic Cemetery at Find a Grave

Catholic cemeteries
Cemeteries in Hong Kong
Roman Catholic Diocese of Hong Kong